Myles P. Murray (October 1906 – April 16, 1985) was a Canadian politician and lawyer. He represented the electoral district of Ferryland in the Newfoundland and Labrador House of Assembly from 1952 to 1966. He was a member of the Liberal Party of Newfoundland and Labrador.

The son of Mary and Michael Murray, he was born in Murray's Pond, Portugal Cove. Murray was educated at Saint Bonaventure's College and Memorial University College. He articled in the law offices of William R. Howley, was called to the Newfoundland bar in 1930 and set up practice in St. John's. He married Doreen Whitaker in 1941; the couple had two sons. During World War II, he served with the Royal Artillery and then with the Royal Air Force. After the war, Murray joined the Newfoundland Department of Justice. In 1950, he was named King's Counsel.

He ran unsuccessfully in the provincial riding of Harbour Main-Bell Island in 1949. Murray was defeated by two votes in the 1951 election but, during the recount, voting irregularities were noticed and the result of the election was set aside. He won the subsequent by-election held in 1952. Murray served in the Newfoundland cabinet as Minister of Provincial Affairs and then Minister of Public Welfare. He retired from politics in 1966 and was named a magistrate in the District Court for St. John's. He died in St. John's at the age of 78.

References

1906 births
1985 deaths
Liberal Party of Newfoundland and Labrador MHAs
Canadian King's Counsel
People from Portugal Cove-St. Philip's
British Army personnel of World War II
Royal Artillery personnel
Royal Air Force personnel of World War II
Canadian military personnel from Newfoundland and Labrador
Royal Air Force airmen